Han Jinsuo (born 15 March 1959) is a Chinese biathlete. He competed in the 10 km sprint event at the 1980 Winter Olympics.

References

External links
 

1959 births
Living people
Chinese male biathletes
Olympic biathletes of China
Biathletes at the 1980 Winter Olympics
Place of birth missing (living people)